National Highway 326A (NH 326A) is a National Highway in that passes through two Indian states of Odisha and Andhra Pradesh. It was formed as a new highway by the up-gradation of former state highways in the two states. It starts at Mohana of Odisha and ends at Narasannapeta road of Andhra Pradesh.

Route 

It starts at Mohana in Odisha and passes through Paralakhemundi, Kotabommali junction and ends at Narasannapeta in Andhra Pradesh.

State-wise route length are:

Odisha - 

Andhra Pradesh -

See also 
 List of National Highways in Andhra Pradesh

References 

326A
326A
National highways in India